Eugene Robert Glazer (born December 16, 1942 in Brooklyn, New York) is an American actor best known for his portrayal of "Operations" on the TV show La Femme Nikita. Glazer was raised in Brooklyn, New York, and worked at a variety of jobs before moving to Los Angeles in the 1970s to pursue his acting career. He worked in live theater and starred in a number of television and movie roles before being cast on La Femme Nikita. He was married to late actress Xenia Gratsos, who joined him on La Femme Nikita as Renee in the 3rd season episode "Hand to Hand".

Filmography

Film

Television

Selected bibliography
 Heyn, Christopher.  "A Conversation with Eugene Robert Glazer."  Inside Section One: Creating and Producing TV's La Femme Nikita.  Introduction by Peta Wilson.  Los Angeles: Persistence of Vision Press, 2006. 82-87. . In-depth conversation with Eugene Robert Glazer about his role as Operations on La Femme Nikita, as well as his acting experience in both the U.S. and Canada.

External links
 

American male television actors
American male film actors
Living people
1942 births